The 2021 Podemos state assembly—officially the 4rd Citizen Assembly, and more informally referred to as Vistalegre IV—was held during 12 and 13 June 2021. The assembly took place for the first place outside of Vistalegre, taking place in a venue in Alcorcón. Ione Belarra was elected Secretary-General with over 80% of the votes.

Background

2021 Madrilenian regional election 
On 15 March 2021, Pablo Iglesias, leader of Podemos since its foundation, announced that he planned to resign from his post as Deputy Prime Minister of Spain to lead his party in the 2021 Madrilenian regional election, pointing at Yolanda Díaz, Minister of Labour, as his successor as leader of United We Can, a party coalition between Podemos and United Left, among others. Díaz was a member of the latter, therefore she could not lead Podemos in the eventuality of Iglesias resigning. 

Podemos performed poorly in the election, placing fifth with 7.2% of votes, only a small increase. The overall result was a dramatic victory for the conservative People's Party, whom far-right Vox pledged to support. After the announcement of the results, Iglesias announced he would resign from his offices and retire from politics. He stated he had been turned into "a scapegoat" who "mobilizes the worst of those who hate democracy."

After Iglesias' resignation 
Quickly after Iglesias resignation, Podemos leadership announced the start of the process to elect a new leadership to the party. Ione Belarra, who replaced Iglesias in his duties in the cabinet was seen as the preferred option by Podemos establishment to the post of Secretary-General.

The assembly was set to take place in Paco de Lucía auditorium, in Alcorcón, becoming the first time to take place outside Vistalegre arena, in Madrid. Iglesias refused to attend the assembly.

Results

Secretary General

External links 

 Podemos Fourth Assembly official web page

References 

Podemos (Spanish political party) 
2021 conferences 
Political party assemblies in Spain 
Political party leadership elections in Spain